Cade Cust (born 14 September 1998) is an Australian professional rugby league footballer who plays as a  or  for the Wigan Warriors in the Super League. 
 
He previously played for the Manly Warringah Sea Eagles in the National Rugby League.

Background
Cust was born in Scone, New South Wales, Australia. He is of Aboriginal descent.

Cust was a Scone Thoroughbreds junior.

Playing career

Blacktown Workers Sea Eagles
At the start of the 2019 NRL season, Cust played in the Canterbury Cup NSW for Manly's feeder club side the Blacktown Workers Sea Eagles.

Manly Warringah
In Round 10 2019, Cust made his NRL debut for Manly Warringah against the Cronulla-Sutherland Sharks at Shark Park.  Cust scored his first try for Manly in Round 12 2019 against Penrith at Penrith Park in which Manly lost the match 15-12.

Cust was limited to only ten games for Manly in the 2021 NRL season.  He did not play in the club's finals campaign which saw Manly reach the preliminary final.

Wigan
On 12 November 2021, Cust signed a two-year deal with English side Wigan.
In round 1 of the 2022 Super League season, Cust made his club debut for Wigan in a 24-10 victory over Hull Kingston Rovers.
On 28 May 2022, he played for Wigan in their 2022 Challenge Cup Final victory over Huddersfield.
In round 24 of the 2022 Super League season, Cust scored two tries in a 52-6 victory over Toulouse Olympique.

References

External links

Manly Sea Eagles profile

1998 births
Living people
Australian people of Indigenous Australian descent
Australian rugby league players
Manly Warringah Sea Eagles players
Rugby league five-eighths
Rugby league halfbacks
Rugby league players from Scone, New South Wales
Indigenous Australian rugby league players
Wigan Warriors players
Australian expatriate sportspeople in England